Alfonso Marte (born 16 April 1992) is a Dominican footballer who plays for German club SV Saar 05 Saarbrücken as a midfielder.

International career
Marte was named for the first time in Dominican Republic's main squad for the 2018 FIFA World Cup qualifiers. He made his international debut on 11 June 2015, starting in a 1–2 loss against Belize.

References

External links

1992 births
Living people
People from Santo Domingo Province
Dominican Republic footballers
Association football midfielders
Bayer 04 Leverkusen II players
SV Elversberg players
Dominican Republic international footballers
Dominican Republic expatriate footballers
Expatriate footballers in Germany